Galdhøpiggen is the highest mountain in Norway, Scandinavia, and Northern Europe. It is in the Jotunheimen mountains within Jotunheimen National Park. The mountain is surrounded by several other notable mountains including Keilhaus topp to the east; Store Styggehøe to the southeast; Svellnosbreahesten, Midtre Tverråtinden, and Store Tverråtinden to the south; Storjuvtinden and Skardstinden to the west; Veslpiggen, Storgrovtinden, and Storgrovhøe to the northwest; and Galdhøi and Juvvasshøi to the northeast.

Etymology
Galdhøpiggen means "the peak/spike (piggen) of the mountain Galdhø." The first element in the name of the mountain is gald (m.) which means "steep mountain road". The last element is hø (f.) which means "(big and) rounded mountain." An old road between Gudbrandsdalen and Sogn passes beneath the mountain.

History 

Geologically, Galdhøpiggen belongs to the Caledonian folding, like most of South Norway's mountain ranges. The peak is made of gabbro, a hard but rather coarse-grained rock which is found in most of the Jotunheimen range. During the ice ages it was heavily glaciated and got its present form. The theory that the highest summits in Norway stayed above the ice as nunataks has been abandoned by most geologists. It fits well with the present flora in the area, but it does not fit well with the present knowledge of ice thickness and the results of glaciation.

For many years, geologists did not know that Galdhøpiggen was in fact the highest summit in Norway. That distinction was instead granted to Snøhetta in the Dovrefjell range, visible on the Oslo-Trondheim land route. Hence no attempts were made to climb the peak, while Snøhetta was visited for the first time in 1798 as part of a scientific trip to the area. In 1844 the geologist and mountaineer, Baltazar Mathias Keilhau, made two unsuccessful attempts to reach the summit. On one of these he reached a summit, which was later named Keilhaus topp (at 2,355 m above sea level very close to Galdhøpiggen), but the terrible weather forced him to return.

In 1850 three men from Lom reached the summit; the guide Steinar Sulheim, the local teacher Lars Arnesen and the church warden Ingebrigt Flotten.

Access and modern tourism 
Access to the top of Galdhøpiggen is not especially hard: from Juvasshytta (1,850 metres above sea level, 5 km from the summit) it takes about three hours up (including about 45 minutes to prepare for crossing the Styggebreen glacier), an hour at the top and about two hours back. Some days in the summer, a few hundred people reach the summit each day. Guides are needed to cross the glacier, but are available every summer morning.

The main season for hiking to Galdhøpiggen is between June and August. The season is determined by the melting and first appearance of snow, so it does not follow a set date. 

It takes four hours to ascend and two hours to descend. From Spiterstulen, hikers do not have to cross the Styggebreen glacier, and hence a guide is not required. Ardent peak-baggers may count three summits on the route from Spiterstulen: Svellnose, Keilhaus topp and the summit itself. During the main season guided trips take one to the summit from Spiterstulen via the well known blue ice fall on Svellnosbreen.

It is called Galdhøpiggen Summer Ski Centre and is open from June and all the summer when the road is open.

Summit 
Galdhøpiggen had earlier been challenged for the title as the highest mountain in Norway by Glittertind, as some measurements showed Glittertind was slightly higher including the glacier at its peak.

This glacier has, however, shrunk in recent years, and Glittertind is now only  even including the glacier. Hence, the dispute has been settled in Galdhøpiggen's favour.

At the summit a small cabin has been built. In the summer soft drinks, chocolate bars, postcards and other items are sold here. Earlier the Norwegian Postal Authority had a small post office here—being the highest in Northern Europe. Galdhøpiggen is not only the highest summit in Northern Europe, it also contains two probably unbreakable horticultural records in Northern Europe, being the upper limit for Ranunculus glacialis (2370 m) and Saxifraga oppositifolia (2350 m). Since the summer might not occur at all, some years, it tells something about these flowers' adaptation to the extremely harsh climate.

On sunny days in the later part of July and August, the summit is visited by hundreds of people.

Media gallery

See also
 List of mountains in Norway by height
 Extreme points of Norway
 List of mountain peaks by prominence
 List of European ultra-prominent peaks
 Scandinavian mountain range

References

Notes

Sources

External links 

 Galdhøpiggen
 "Galdhøpiggen, Norway" on Peakbagger
 Galdhøpiggen
 Droner i naturen skaper reaksjoner: – Mange driter i at det er forbud (18 June 2021) NRK
 Juvasshytta 
 Computer generated summit panoramas North South Index

 
Lom, Norway
Mountains of Innlandet
Highest points of Norwegian counties
Highest points of countries